Sparganium natans is a species of bur-reed known by the common names least bur-reed and small bur-reed. It is a water circumboreal plant inhabiting North America, Europe, West Asia and Japan. It is usually found submersed in shallow, calm water. This bur-reed has thin, flexible, grasslike leaves which float in the water. Plants that spend more time out of water at the waterline are tougher and have shorter leaves. The plant bears two inflorescences, the staminate type being a rounded white filamentous ball and the pistillate type a sphere of thick, green, pointy peduncles. The fruits are small green or brown achenes.

References

External links 
 Calflora Database: Sparganium natans  (Small bur reed)
 Jepson Manual treatment of Sparganium natans
 UC CalPhotos gallery

natans
Freshwater plants
Grasses of Canada
Grasses of the United States
Native grasses of California
Flora of the Northeastern United States
Flora of the Western United States
Flora of the Sierra Nevada (United States)
Plants described in 1753
Taxa named by Carl Linnaeus
Flora without expected TNC conservation status